Fani Supriyanto (born 30 May 2004) is an Indonesian footballer who plays a goalkeeper for Persis Women and the Indonesia women's national team.

Club career
Fani has played for Asprov Jateng in Indonesia. She is currently playing for Persis Women.

International career 
Fani represented Indonesia at the 2022 AFC Women's Asian Cup.

References

External links

2004 births
Living people
Sportspeople from Central Java
Indonesian women's footballers
Women's association football goalkeepers
Indonesia women's youth international footballers
Indonesia women's international footballers